Arrakis may refer to:

 Arrakis (fixed star), a various form of the proper name Alrakis for Mu Draconis.
 Arrakis (fictional planet), is also the name of the fictional planet on which Frank Herbert's novel Dune is set. However, the planet's primary is the star Canopus.
Arrakis Planitia, a plain on Saturn's moon Titan
Arrakis Therapeutics, a biotechnology company